The Dierks Limestone is a geologic formation in Arkansas. It preserves fossils dating back to the Cretaceous period.

See also 
 List of fossiliferous stratigraphic units in Arkansas
 Paleontology in Arkansas

References

External links 
 

Cretaceous Arkansas
Aptian Stage